The Fusulinacea is a superfamily in the Fusulinida in which the test is spherical, discoida, or fusiform; commonly coiled, less often uncoiling in the late stage, numerous chambers per whorl; test wall of microgranular calcite (as for the order) in one to four layers. Tunnels or secondary foramina may result from partial resorption  and secondary deposition may produce chomata, parachomate, tectoria, and axial fillings. Range: M Devonian (Givetian) - U Permian (Djulfian )

Families
The Fusulinacea, as revised in Loeblich and Tappan, 1988, includes 7 families, 27 subfamilies, and 164 genera. The families are:

 Loeblichidae
 Ozawainellidae
 Fusulinidae
 Schwagerinidae
 Staffelllidae
 Verbeekinidae
 Neoschwageriidae—listed according to the reference.

References

 Alfred R. Loeblich Jr and Helen Tappan,1988. Forminiferal Genera and their Classification. Van Nostrand Reinhold. see Fusulinina-GSI

Foraminifera superfamilies